Akshay Chandrashekhar is an Indian actor, producer and entrepreneur who works primarily in Kannada films. He made his acting debut in the Kannada short film Mahaan Hutatma, which was the first Kannada language short film to win a national film award – special mention for a non feature film at to he 66th National Film Awards in 2018. The film was produced by Akshay Chandrashekhar, under his production company Akshay Entertainment, which is based in Bangalore, Karnataka.

References

External links
 

Living people
Male actors in Kannada cinema
Film producers from Bangalore